Thunstrom, Thunström, Thunstrøm, is a Swedish surname. It may also be spelled as Thunstroem, Thunstrœm, Thunstrem, Thunstrohm, Thunstroom, Thunstroum.

People with this surname include:

 Allie Thunstrom (born 1988), U.S. ice hockey player
 Frida Svedin Thunström (born 1989), Swedish ice hockey player
 Olle Thunstrom, Swedish saxophonist; member of Beat Funktion

See also

 Thun (disambiguation)
 Strom (disambiguation)